Suciu is a Romanian surname and may refer to:

People
Alexandru Suciu (born 1960), footballer
Alin Suciu (born 1978), coptologist
Aurel Suciu (1853–1898), signatory of the Transylvanian Memorandum
Coriolan Suciu (1895–1967), historian and Greek-Catholic priest
Dan Suciu (born 1957), professor in Computer Science and Engineering at the University of Washington
Daniel Suciu (born 1980), politician
Ioan Suciu (1907–1953), Greek-Catholic bishop and victim of the communist regime
Ioan Silviu Suciu (born 1977), gymnast, shared bronze medal at the 2004 Summer Olympics
Lucreția Suciu-Rudow (1859–1900), poet
Mark Suciu (born 1992), professional skateboarder
Sergiu Suciu (born 1990), professional footballer 
Vasile Suciu (bishop) (1873–1935), Greek-Catholic metropolitan bishop and theologian
Vasile Suciu (footballer) (1942–2013), professional footballer

Places
 Suciu de Sus, a commune in Maramureș County, and its village of Suciu de Jos
 Suciu (river), a tributary of the Lăpuș in Maramureș County

Romanian-language surnames